Nyctemera ludekingii is a moth of the family Erebidae first described by Vollenhoven in 1863. It is found on Sumatra and Borneo.

Adults are day-flying.

References

Nyctemerina
Moths described in 1863